Measles is an infectious disease.

Measles may also refer to:
Measles vaccine, a vaccine against measles
Measles morbillivirus, a non-segmented RNA virus
Measles virus encoding the human thyroidal sodium iodide symporter, an attenuated strain
Measles hemagglutinin, a hemagglutinin produced by measles

See also